Afromicrodon is an African genus of hoverflies. The species of the genus Afromicrodon were previously and erroneously placed in the genus Ceratophya.

Afromicrodon species are recognized among the Microdontinae by them lacking an appendix on vein R4+5, having short antennae about as long as the face or shorter, and a simple basoflagellomere and simple scutellum without calcar. The abdomen is oval.

Distribution
All currently known species are restricted to Madagascar and the Comoros Islands.

Species
Afromicrodon comoroensis (De Meyer, De Bruyn & Janssons, 1990) originally placed in genus Ceratophya
Afromicrodon johannae (van Doesburg, 1957) originally placed in genus Microdon
Afromicrodon luciferus (Hull, 1941) originally placed in genus Microdon
Afromicrodon madecassa (Keiser, 1971) originally placed in genus Ceratophya
Afromicrodon stuckenbergi (Keiser, 1971) originally placed in genus Ceratophya

References

Hoverfly genera
Diptera of Africa
Microdontinae